Mateo Alto is a Qom Anglican Suffragan Bishop in Northern Argentina.

References

Living people
Anglican bishops of Northern Argentina
21st-century Anglican bishops in South America
Argentine people of Qom descent
Year of birth missing (living people)
Argentine Anglicans